Edward Ballantine (August 6, 1886 – July 2, 1971), was an American composer and professor of music.

Biography
Edward Ballantine was born in Oberlin, Ohio, on August 6, 1886, the son of William Gay Ballantine, the fourth president of Oberlin College, and Emma Frances Atwood. One brother Arthur Atwood was the senior member of the New York law firm of Root, Clark, Buckner & Ballantine—later Dewey, Ballantine, Bushby, Palmer & Wood. Another brother Henry Winthrop was Professor of Law, at Boalt Hall School of Law. Through his paternal grandfather, Rev. Elisha Ballantine, he is distantly related to four U.S. Presidents, and descended from the first American female writer Anne Bradstreet, and from Massachusetts Bay Colony founder and first Governor John Winthrop.

Education and career
He studied with Walter Spalding and Frederick Converse at Harvard University, where he received a BA in 1907. He was awarded highest final honors in music at Harvard University and an orchestral composition of his was played by the Boston Symphony Orchestra at Boston, Massachusetts on June 14, 1907. He then pursued his studies with Artur Schnabel, Rudolf Ganz, and Philippe Rüferthen in Berlin from 1907 to 1909. He returned to the United States where he joined the Harvard music faculty in 1912, where he remained until his retirement in 1947. His best-known compositions are two sets of piano variations on "Mary Had a Little Lamb" (1924, 1943), in which each variation is in the style of a different composer.

Marriage
In 1923 he married, as her second husband, Florence Foster Besse, a childhood friend and the daughter of Henrietta Louisa Segee and Lyman W. Besse, who owned an extensive chain of clothing stores in the Northeast known as "The Besse System". She was a 1907 Phi Beta Kappa graduate of Wellesley College. She had married as her first husband, Kingman Brewster, Sr. They separated in 1923 and were later divorced. They were the parents of Kingman Brewster, Jr., who was an educator, diplomat, and president of Yale University.

Death
He died on July 2, 1971 at his home at Vineyard Haven, a census-designated place (CDP) in the town of Tisbury on Martha's Vineyard in Dukes County, Massachusetts, United States.

References
Arzuni, Sahan. 1994. "An American Jester". Keyboard Classics & Piano Stylist 14, no. 5:54–56.
 
 

Footnotes

External links
Jones, Howard Mumford. "Mary Had a Little Lamb (December 1950)". Quodlibet website (Accessed February 23, 2010)

20th-century classical composers
American male classical composers
American classical composers
Composers for violin
Composers for piano
1886 births
1971 deaths
People from Oberlin, Ohio
Harvard College alumni
Harvard University faculty
People from Tisbury, Massachusetts
20th-century American composers
Classical musicians from Massachusetts
Classical musicians from Ohio
20th-century American male musicians